Del Norte High School may refer to: 

Del Norte High School (Crescent City, California), Crescent City, California
Del Norte High School (San Diego), San Diego, California
Del Norte Junior/Senior High School, Del Norte, Colorado
Del Norte High School (New Mexico), Albuquerque, New Mexico